The 1929 Purdue Boilermakers football team represented Purdue University in the 1929 college football season. In their eighth year under head coach James Phelan, the Boilermakers compiled an undefeated 8–0 record (5–0 Big Ten) and outscored their opponents by a total of 187 to 44.

Schedule

Players
 Horace Buttner
 Paul Calvert
 Elbert Caraway
 J. M. Christman
 Richard Chubb
 Harold Cloud
 Al Deutch
 Livy Eward
 William Fulton
 Glen Harmeson
 Harry Huntsinger
 Howard Kissell
 William Mackle
 Charles Miller
 E. A. Moon
 Lew Pope
 James Purvis
 Eddie Risk
 Les Sherbeck
 Elmer Sleight
 Don Trimble
 George VanBibber
 Sam Voinoff
 Ralph Welch
 John White
 Bill Woerner
 Alex Yunevich

Coaches and administrators
 Head coach: James Phelan
 Assistant coaches:

References

Purdue
Purdue Boilermakers football seasons
Big Ten Conference football champion seasons
College football undefeated seasons
Purdue Boilermakers football